Peter Smith (born 8 February 1968) is an Australian former cricketer. He played one first-class cricket match for Victoria in 1991.

See also
 List of Victoria first-class cricketers

References

External links
 

1968 births
Living people
Australian cricketers
Victoria cricketers
Cricketers from Melbourne